Percy is a given name and a surname.

Percy may also refer to:

Places

France
 Percy, Isère, a commune
 Percy, Manche, a village and commune

United Kingdom
 Bolton Percy, North Yorkshire
 Kilnwick Percy, East Riding of Yorkshire
 Percy Main, Tyne and Wear

United States
 Percy, Illinois, a village
 Percy, Mississippi, an unincorporated community
 Percy Township, Kittson County, Minnesota

Antarctica
 Mount Percy, Graham Land

Entertainment

Films
 Percy (1925 film), an American silent comedy film
 Percy (1971 film), a British comedy
 Percy (1989 film), an Indian comedy drama by Pervez Merwanji
 Percy (2020 film), a drama film directed by Clark Johnson

Literature
 Percy (novel), a 1969 comedy novel by Raymond Hitchcock

Music
 Percy (band), a British post-punk band
 Percy (soundtrack), soundtrack of the 1971 film, by The Kinks
 Percy Folio, an 1867 book of English ballads

Other uses
 House of Percy, an English aristocratic family
 Baron Percy, a title created several times in the Peerage of England
 Cyclone Percy, a 2005 South Pacific cyclone
 Tropical Storm Percy, various typhoons and a storm
 Hôpital d'instruction des armées Percy, a military hospital in France
 Perseverance (rover), Mars rover nicknamed Percy

See also
 Perci (disambiguation)
 Persi (disambiguation)
 Peirce (disambiguation)
 Perse (disambiguation)